Kate Fansler is the main character in a series of fourteen mystery novels written by Carolyn Gold Heilbrun from 1964-2002, under the pseudonym Amanda Cross.

Overview
Like Heilbrun, Fansler was a literature professor at a prestigious New York university. In the books, she is called upon to solve mysteries set in an academic context, usually involving the murder of a professor or student. Her work is accomplished through conversation with the people involved, rather than through the physically adventurous antics preferred by other fictional detectives. Midway through the series, she married her partner, district attorney Reed Amhearst, but as she tells another character in A Trap For Fools, she "neither uses his name nor wears his ring". Echoing Heilbrun's personal views, she has little sentimental attachment to children, enjoys smoking, drinking, and fatty food, and in later books such as Sweet Death, Kind Death, meditates on the nature of middle age and on the liberating nature of death.

Books in the series

Bibliography
 New York Times article: "Rage in a Tenured Position"

Fictional amateur detectives
Literary characters introduced in 1964
Fictional professors
Characters in American novels of the 20th century
Characters in American novels of the 21st century